El mudo is a 2013 Peruvian thriller drama film directed by Diego Vega and Daniel Vega. It was screened in the Contemporary World Cinema section at the 2013 Toronto International Film Festival.

Cast
 Fernando Bacilio
 Lidia Rodríguez
 Juan Luis Maldonado
 Augusto Varillas
 José Luis Gómez
 Norka Ramírez
 Ernesto Ráez

References

External links
 

2013 films
2013 thriller drama films
2013 crime drama films
Peruvian thriller drama films
Peruvian crime drama films
2010s Peruvian films
2010s Spanish-language films